Naseer Khan (born 14 October 1972) is a Pakistani first-class cricketer who played for Quetta.

References

External links
 

1972 births
Living people
Pakistani cricketers
Quetta cricketers
Cricketers from Quetta